All-Night Fox is an album by The Howling Hex.  It was released as a CD by Drag City in 2005.

Track listing
"Now, We're Gonna Sing" – 3:36
"Instilled With Mem'ry" – 4:26
"Pair Back Up Mass With" – 3:57
"Activity Risks" – 5:06
"To His Own Front Door" – 4:59
"What, Man? Who Are You?!" – 7:15
"Cast Aside the False" – 2:10
"Soft Enfolding Spreads" – 3:58

Reception
Stylus (B) 
Uncut  Mar. 2005, p. 96
The Wire (favorable) Apr. 2005, p. 59

Personnel
The Howling Hex:
Neil Michael Hagerty – vocals, lead guitar
July McClure – vocals, bass guitar
Lynn Madison – vocals, drums
Pete Denton – rhythm guitar

References

2005 albums
Howling Hex albums
Drag City (record label) albums